Salzach is a river of Baden-Württemberg, Germany. It is the left headstream of the Saalbach.

See also
List of rivers of Baden-Württemberg

References

Rivers of Baden-Württemberg
Rivers of Germany